GIF Nike is a Swedish football club located in Lomma in Skåne.

Background
The club was formed in May 1919 and its first chairman was named Tage de la Motte. The current chairman is Lars Sätmark.

Since their foundation GIF Nike has participated mainly in the middle and lower divisions of the Swedish football league system. During two seasons, 1965 and 1966, Nike played in Division 2 which at that time was the second tier of Swedish football. The club's attendance record was set for a derby match against IFK Malmö in June 1965 with 6,426 spectators at Lomma IP. Nike won the match 1–0.

In 2007 GIF Nike played in Division 2 after winning in Division 3 in 2006. GIF Nike is not just a football club as floorball is also prominent. In the summer of 2006 the badminton section was disbanded. GIF Nike's colours were established as red after the team in the 1970s voted for this. The inspiration is said to have come from Liverpool.

The club currently (2014) plays in Division 2 Västra Götaland which is the fourth tier of Swedish football. They play their home matches at the Lomma IP.

In 2009 and 2010 GIF Nike finished in tenth position in Division 2 Södra Götaland and faced the relegation playoffs.  On each occasion they were successful beating FC Trelleborg in 2009 and Höörs IS in 2010.

GIF Nike are affiliated to the Skånes Fotbollförbund.

Season to season

Attendances

In recent seasons GIF Nike have had the following average attendances:

Footnotes

External links
 GIF Nike – Official website

GIF Nike
Football clubs in Skåne County
Association football clubs established in 1919
GIF Nike